Valeri Semyonovich Frid (13 January 1922 – 7 September 1998) was a Soviet screenwriter. Most of his works were made together with Yuli Dunsky.

Filmography

Writer 
 1991 Lost in Siberia
 1990 Death in Сinema
 1987 The Tale of the Painter in Love
 1984 And Then Came Bumbo
 1983 Every Tenth
 1983 Adventures of the Little Muk
 1982 The Story of the Voyages
 1981 Don't be Afraid, I'm with You
 1980 Air Crew
 1980 The Gadfly
 1979 The Adventures of Sherlock Holmes and Dr. Watson: Bloody Signature
 1979 The Adventures of Sherlock Holmes and Doctor Watson: Acquaintance
 1976 How Czar Peter the Great Married Off His Moor
 1976 The Widows
 1974 High Title / For the Life on Earth
 1973 High Title / I, Shapovalov T. P.
 1971 The Shadow
 1970 Shine, Shine, My Star
 1969 An Old, Old Tale
 1968 Bare et liv - historien om Fridtjof Nansen (Just One Life)
 1968 Two Comrades Were Serving
 1965 Once Upon a Time There Was an Old Man and an Old Woman
 1964 An Unthinkable Story
 1962 Seven Nannies
 1962 Sixteenth Spring
 1960 The Same Age
 1957 The Case at Mine Eight

Actor 

 1998 Classicist
 1968 Two Comrades Were Serving
 1999 Chinese Tea-Set

References

External links 
 

1922 births
1998 deaths
Soviet screenwriters
Male screenwriters
Academic staff of High Courses for Scriptwriters and Film Directors
People from Tomsk
20th-century screenwriters
Soviet dramatists and playwrights
Gulag detainees
Gerasimov Institute of Cinematography alumni
Recipients of the Nika Award